In Greek mythology, there were at least three people named Thymoetes (Ancient Greek: Θυμοίτης Thumoítēs).

Thymoetes, one of the elders of Troy (also spelled Thymoetus) and also a Trojan prince as the son of King Laomedon. A soothsayer had predicted that, on a certain day, a boy would be born by whom Troy would be destroyed. On that very day Paris was born to King Priam of Troy, and Munippus to Thymoetes. Priam ordered Munippus and his mother Cilla to be killed in order to prevent the prophecy from being fulfilled while sparing his own son. It is believed that Thymoetes, in order to avenge his family, advised to draw the wooden horse into the city.
Thymoetes, an Athenian hero, son of Oxyntes, king of Attica. He was the last Athenian king descended from Theseus. He was succeeded by Melanthus (according to Pausanias, overthrown by him).
Thymoetes, a Trojan and a companion of Aeneas, who was slain by Turnus.

Notes

References 

 Dictys Cretensis, from The Trojan War. The Chronicles of Dictys of Crete and Dares the Phrygian translated by Richard McIlwaine Frazer, Jr. (1931-). Indiana University Press. 1966. Online version at the Topos Text Project.
 Homer, The Iliad with an English Translation by A.T. Murray, Ph.D. in two volumes. Cambridge, MA., Harvard University Press; London, William Heinemann, Ltd. 1924. . Online version at the Perseus Digital Library.
Homer, Homeri Opera in five volumes. Oxford, Oxford University Press. 1920. . Greek text available at the Perseus Digital Library.
 John Tzetzes, Book of Histories, Book I translated by Ana Untila from the original Greek of T. Kiessling's edition of 1826.  Online version at theio.com
 Pausanias, Description of Greece with an English Translation by W.H.S. Jones, Litt.D., and H.A. Ormerod, M.A., in 4 Volumes. Cambridge, MA, Harvard University Press; London, William Heinemann Ltd. 1918. . Online version at the Perseus Digital Library
Pausanias, Graeciae Descriptio. 3 vols. Leipzig, Teubner. 1903.  Greek text available at the Perseus Digital Library.
 Publius Vergilius Maro, Aeneid. Theodore C. Williams. trans. Boston. Houghton Mifflin Co. 1910. Online version at the Perseus Digital Library.
 Publius Vergilius Maro, Bucolics, Aeneid, and Georgics. J. B. Greenough. Boston. Ginn & Co. 1900. Latin text available at the Perseus Digital Library.

Trojans
People of the Trojan War
Kings of Athens
Kings in Greek mythology
Attican characters in Greek mythology
Characters in the Aeneid